The Tale of Genji is a classic work of Japanese literature. It has been adapted into the following films:

 The Tale of Genji (1951 film), directed by Kōzaburō Yoshimura
 The Tale of Genji (1966 film), directed by Kon Ichikawa
 The Tale of Genji (1987 film), directed by Gisaburo Sugii

See also
 Sennen no Koi Story of Genji, a 2001 film directed by Tonko Horikawa